This is a partial list of FM radio stations in Nepal.

List of stations

References 

Radio stations in Nepal
Radio
Radio